Émile Poisson (25 May 1905 in Ouidah, Dahomey – 4 June 1999 in Paris), was a politician from Benin who served in the French Senate from 1947 to 1955. He was a métis. Prior to election to the French Senate he had been a schoolmaster.

References 

 page on the French Senate website

Beninese politicians
French Senators of the Fourth Republic
1905 births
1999 deaths
People from Ouidah
Senators of French West Africa
20th-century Beninese politicians